This is the list of episodes of the British children's television drama series, Bernard's Watch.

Overview

Original series

Series 1 (1997)

Series 2 (1998)

Series 3 (1999)

Series 4 (2000)

Series 5 (2001)

New series

Series 1 (2004)

Series 2 (2005)

References

Lists of British children's television series episodes